Jüri Võigemast (born 18 November 1956 in Rapla) is an Estonian politician. 

From 1991 he is a member of the Estonian Centre Party.

In 2002–2003 he was a member of IX Riigikogu.

His son is an actor Priit Võigemast.

References

Living people
Estonian Centre Party politicians
Members of the Riigikogu, 1999–2003
1956 births
People from Rapla Parish